Ahmedabad Lok Sabha constituency was in Gujarat state in western India till 2008. After the reorg of 2009, Ahmedabad East Lok Sabha constituency and Ahmedabad West Lok Sabha constituency became the two constituencies from the city, sending a representative to the parliament.

Vidhan Sabha segments
Ahmedabad Lok Sabha constituency comprised the following 7 Vidhan Sabha (legislative assembly) segments:

Members of Lok Sabha
1951: Two-candidates elected from this seat.
 Ganesh Vasudev Mavalankar and Muldas Bhudardas Vaishya, both from Indian National Congress
1956 (by-poll): Sushila Ganesh Mavalankar, (Congress) (Won by-poll caused by her husband's death unopposed)
1957: Two-candidates elected from this seat again.
 Indulal Kanaiyalal Yagnik, Mahagujarat Janata Parishad / Karsandas Ukabhai Parmar, Independent
1962: Indulal Kanaiyalal Yagnik, Nutan Mahagujarat Janata Parishad
1967: Indulal Kanaiyalal Yagnik, Independent
1971: Indulal Kanaiyalal Yagnik, (Congress this time, defeated NCO opponent)
1972 (by-poll): Purushottam Mavalankar, Independent (By Poll, after Yagnik's death)
1977: Ahsan Jafri, Indian National Congress
1980: Maganbhai Barot, Indian National Congress (Indira)
1984: Haroobhai Mehta, Indian National Congress
1989: Harin Pathak, Bharatiya Janata Party
1991: Harin Pathak, Bharatiya Janata Party
1996: Harin Pathak, Bharatiya Janata Party
1998: Harin Pathak, Bharatiya Janata Party
1999: Harin Pathak, Bharatiya Janata Party

Election results

2004

1999

1998

1996

1991

1989

1984

1980

1977

1971 
 Indulal Kanaiyalal Yagnik (INC) : 193,834 votes 
 Jaykrishna Harivallabhdas (NCO) : 137,374

1972
 P.G.Mavalankar (IND) : 112,026 votes
 Manubhai Palkhiwala (INC) : 86,579

1952 
 First Seat
 Vaishya Muldas Bhudardas (INC) : 203,928 votes
 Goswami Krishnajiwanji Gokulnathji (RRP) : 112,239
 Second seat
 Mavlankar Ganesh Vasudeo (INC) : 230,778 votes
 Parmar Balwantrai Govindrai (SCF) : 69,443

See also
 Ahmedabad East Lok Sabha constituency
 Ahmedabad West Lok Sabha constituency
 Sarkhej Assembly constituency
 Ahmedabad district
 List of former constituencies of the Lok Sabha

References

Ahmedabad district
Former Lok Sabha constituencies of Gujarat
Former constituencies of the Lok Sabha
2008 disestablishments in India
Constituencies disestablished in 2008